Varhadi is a dialect of Marathi spoken in Vidarbha region of Maharashtra and by Marathi people of adjoining parts of Madhya Pradesh, Chhattisgarh and Telangana in India.

Vocabulary and grammar 

Although all the dialects of Marathi are mutually intelligible to one another up to a great extent, each dialect can be distinctly identified by its unique characteristics. Likewise, Varhadi replaces the case endings lā (ला) and nā (ना) of standard Marathi with le (ले), a feature it shares with neighboring Khandeshi language. So, malā (मला) (to me) of standard Marathi becomes male (मले) while tyānnā (त्यांना) (to them) becomes tyāle (त्याले) in Varhadi. The common examples of Hindi words in Varhadi which are different than standard Marathi are:

	
The grammatical changes in Varhadi differing from standard Marathi & closer to Hindi are:

Apart from this, there are many words & phrases indigenous to Varhadi i.e. common to neither standard Marathi nor Hindi. Also, there are words & phrases maintained by Varhadi which were present in older Marathi (spoken 300 years ago or even prior to that) and have vanished from mainstream Marathi. E.g., in vocative case,  is said in Varhadi instead of ‘are’ of standard Marathi. Another good example is the sentence construction of past continuous tense e.g. in Varhadi, it is said ‘Tho bahut abhyās kare' or 'To lay abhyās kare' (He studied a lot) unlike To khūp abhyās karāychā' of standard Marathi.

In most of the Indo-Aryan languages (or even in Dravidian languages, for that matter), Sanskritized words of standard language get simplified in spoken dialects. Exceptionally, Varhadi has a few Sanskrit tatsama words for whom the standard Marathi counterparts are modified words (tadbhava shabda) such as in eastern parts of Vidarbha, snake is called  unlike  of standard Marathi.

The forms of Varhadi vary in different parts of Vidarbha and also, as per castes. The similarity to Central Indo Aryan languages increases as one moves towards Madhya Pradesh. E.g. in the parts adjacent to Madhya Pradesh, ‘zāna padte’ (I have to go) is preferred over ‘zā lāgte’, which is similar to Hindi ‘jānā padtā hai’. Also, consonant sound /t͡s/ like in chūk, prevalent in Marathi but absent in Hindi, is often pronounced /t͡ʃ/ like in vach'an. So, pāch/ ([paːt͡s]; five) may be pronounced as pānch/पांच of Hindi.
	
In the areas closer to Marathwada region of Maharashtra and on the contrary, distant to Madhya Pradesh, Varhadi is influenced by dialects of adjacent parts of Marathwada. One can easily recognize a person from Pusad, Digras or Umarkhed taluka of Yavatmal district by his sentence of present continuous tense. Somebody from this area will say ‘mī mandirāt zāylo’ (I am going to visit a temple) instead of ‘mī mandirāt zāun rāhilo’ of other parts of Vidarbha. Similarly, the tone of speech in Chikhli, Mehkar and Deulgaonraja talukas of Buldhana district is similar to that of nearby parts of Marathwada. If someone from this area speaks to a person from Nagpur or Wardha, the latter may get confused whether the former is from Vidarbha or Marathwada. Likewise, Khandeshi dialect spoken in parts of Jalgaon district adjacent to Vidarbha is too similar to be differentiated from Varhadi of Malkapur- Shegaon belt of Buldana district. The perfect varhadi can be heard in Akola and Amravati district.

See also
Nagpur
Vidarbha region of Maharashtra.
Languages in Maharashtra

References

External links

 "Resources in and about the Varhadi-Nagpuri language"
 Varhadi at India9
 Varhadi Language in Penn Libraries

Southern Indo-Aryan languages
Indo-Aryan languages
Vidarbha
Marathi language